The Scott Trial is a British motorcycle trials competition dating from 1914 run over an off-road course of approximately 70 miles. One of the most challenging trials events in the UK, its appeal is to clubman riders as well as international professional riders. The Scott raises money for the "Scott charities", a range of local non-profit making organisations.

History

The Scott Trial began in 1914 when Alfred Angas Scott, inventor and founder of the Scott Motorcycle Company challenged the workers at his factory to ride from the factory in Shipley through the Yorkshire Dales to Burnsall, a riverside village near Grassington. Of the 14 starters only 9 finished. The event was reintroduced after the First World War in 1919 and although Alfred Scott died in 1923 the event continued to be run by the Scott workers until 1926.

The Bradford and District Motor Club then took over the management of the event and moved the start and finish to Blubberhouses, a small village in the borough of Harrogate in North Yorkshire. In 1938 the land was owned by the Leeds Waterworks Authority which decided not to allow motorcycle trials on their property, so the trial was moved again to Swainby, on the north western corner of the North York Moors National Park in Cleveland and control was taken over by the Middlesbrough and Stockton Motor Clubs.

Swaledale
In 1950 the Auto-Cycle Union, the governing body of motorcycle sport in Great Britain, divided  the area into the North Eastern Centre and the Yorkshire Centre and the Scott Trial was moved to Swaledale, one of the northernmost dales in the Yorkshire Dales National Park, where it has remained to this day. The Darlington and District Motor Club took over the organisation until 1990, when the Richmond Motor Club took over.

The 1962 Scott Trial
In his career of over 1000 wins trials champion Sammy Miller considers the 1962 Scott Trial as the greatest ever. A week of rain meant the course was muddy and dangerous.  Conditions were so bad that only 40 finished from a field of 185 that started, with Miller's Ariel 500cc a clear winner.
This was Miller's second of seven Scott Trial wins.

Present day
The current Scott Trial continues to be a time and observation event run over an off-road course of 84 miles, divided into 76 sections. Riders lose marks for putting a foot down or "footing" in the observed sections and for finishing behind the fastest rider. Over the years a huge range of special awards and memorial trophies have become associated with the Scott Trial, including 'best performing Yorkshireman' and 'oldest official finisher'. As in 1962 the weather can be as harsh as the course. In 1998 only 27 of the 147 entries completed the course. On this occasion Graham Jarvis won for the third time with the fastest time of 5 hours 50 minutes. In 2008 rain reduced the finishers to 60 out of 200 with Jarvis winning for the 8th time.
In 2009 Graham Jarvis won again despite being 28 minutes slower than the previous years runner-up James Dabill. His unique skill over the sections, losing him 22 points compared to Dabill's 38, gave him his ninth win.

The 2010 Scott Trial was won James Dabill with a 4-point lead over Graham Jarvis. Three-time winner, Dougie Lampkin, retired due to machine failure in the early stages for the third year in succession.
The 2011 Trial was won by 19-year-old Jonathan Richardson; James Dabill and Ian Austermuhle were joint second.

Women competitors
The first woman to start a Scott Trial was Mrs E. Knowles in 1921. In 1926 Miss Majorie Cottle was the first female official finisher. It was her second attempt and she finished on a further three occasions, the last in 1931. From 1925 Miss E. Foley entered six times but never finished. Before 1940 a further eight women competed but none officially completed the course.

From 1950 to 2001 there were seven female riders, three making two attempts, and one entering three times, but none were successful.

Katy Sunter's first of fourteen attempts was in 2002, and since then she has had ten official finishes. The new wave of women competitors has seen twelve other women enter, of whom Emma Bristow has finished six times, Maria Conway and Chloe Richardson twice.

Gallery

Scott Trial Winners

See also
 Scottish Six Days Trial

References

External links
 Video of the Scott Trial
 Scott Trial gallery

Motorcycle trials
Motorcycle races
Motorsport competitions in the United Kingdom
Sport in North Yorkshire